Pomatiopsis lapidaria is an amphibious species of snail with gills and an operculum, a gastropod mollusk in the family Pomatiopsidae.

Pomatiopsis lapidaria is the type species of the genus Pomatiopsis.

Distribution 
The distribution of Pomatiopsis lapidaria includes the USA.

The type locality was not recorded.

Ecology 
Pomatiopsis lapidaria is amphibious: it lives in damp or wet habitats on marshy ground and in soil that is periodically flooded.

Dundee (1957) described the life history and the anatomy of Pomatiopsis lapidaria in detail.

References

External links 
 Walker B. (1918). "A synopsis of the classification of the freshwater Mollusca of North America, north of Mexico, and a catalogue of the more recently described species, with notes". Miscellaneous Publications 6: 214 pp., 1 plate, 233 figures. [page 34.

Pomatiopsidae
Gastropods described in 1817